A phonemic orthography is an orthography (system for writing a language) in which the graphemes (written symbols) correspond to the phonemes (significant spoken sounds) of the language. Natural languages rarely have perfectly phonemic orthographies; a high degree of grapheme-phoneme correspondence can be expected in orthographies based on alphabetic writing systems, but they differ in how complete this correspondence is. English orthography, for example, is alphabetic but highly nonphonemic; it was once mostly phonemic during the Middle English stage, when the modern spellings originated, but spoken English changed rapidly while the orthography was much more stable, resulting in the modern nonphonemic situation. However, because of their relatively recent modernizations compared to English, the Serbian/Croatian/Bosnian/Montenegrin, Romanian, Italian, Turkish, Spanish, Finnish, Czech, Latvian, Esperanto, Korean and Swahili orthographic systems come much closer to being consistent phonemic representations.

In less formal terms, a language with a highly phonemic orthography may be described as having regular spelling. Another terminology is that of deep and shallow orthographies, in which the depth of an orthography is the degree to which it diverges from being truly phonemic. The concept can also be applied to nonalphabetic writing systems like syllabaries.

Ideal phonemic orthography
In an ideal phonemic orthography, there would be a complete one-to-one correspondence (bijection) between the graphemes (letters) and the phonemes of the language, and each phoneme would invariably be represented by its corresponding grapheme. So the spelling of a word would unambiguously and transparently indicate its pronunciation, and conversely, a speaker knowing the pronunciation of a word would be able to infer its spelling without any doubt. That ideal situation is rare but exists in a few languages.

A disputed example of an ideally phonemic orthography is the Serbo-Croatian language. In its alphabet (Latin as well as Serbian Cyrillic alphabet), there are 30 graphemes, each uniquely corresponding to one of the phonemes. This seemingly perfect yet simple phonemic orthography was achieved in the 19th century—the Cyrillic alphabet first in 1814 by Serbian linguist Vuk Karadžić, and the Latin alphabet in 1830 by Croatian linguist Ljudevit Gaj. However, both Gaj's Latin alphabet and Serbian Cyrillic do not distinguish short and long vowels, and non-tonic (the short one is written), rising, and falling tones that Serbo-Croatian has. In Serbo-Croatian, the tones and vowel lengths were optionally written as (in Latin) ⟨e⟩, ⟨ē⟩, ⟨è⟩, ⟨é⟩, ⟨ȅ⟩, and ⟨ȇ⟩, especially in dictionaries. 

Another such ideal phonemic orthography is native to Esperanto, employing the language creator L. L. Zamenhof's then-pronounced principle “one letter, one sound”.

There are two distinct types of deviation from this phonemic ideal. In the first case, the exact one-to-one correspondence may be lost (for example, some phoneme may be represented by a digraph instead of a single letter), but the "regularity" is retained: there is still an algorithm (but a more complex one) for predicting the spelling from the pronunciation and vice versa. In the second case, true irregularity is introduced, as certain words come to be spelled and pronounced according to different rules from others, and prediction of spelling from pronunciation and vice versa is no longer possible. Common cases of both types of deviation from the ideal are discussed in the following section.

Deviations from phonemic orthography
Some ways in which orthographies may deviate from the ideal of one-to-one grapheme-phoneme correspondence are listed below. The first list contains deviations that tend only to make the relation between spelling and pronunciation more complex, without affecting its predictability (see above paragraph).

Case 1: Regular
Pronunciation and spelling still correspond in a predictable way
A phoneme may be represented by a sequence of letters, called a multigraph, rather than by a single letter (as in the case of the digraph ch in French and the trigraph sch in German). That only retains predictability if the multigraph cannot be broken down into smaller units. Some languages use diacritics to distinguish between a digraph and a sequence of individual letters, and others require knowledge of the language to distinguish them; compare goatherd and loather in English.

Examples:

sch versus s-ch in Romansch

ng versus n + g in Welsh

ch versus çh in Manx Gaelic: this is a slightly different case where the same digraph is used for two different single phonemes.

ai versus aï in French

This is often due to the use of an alphabet that was originally used for a different language (the Latin alphabet in these examples) and so does not have single letters available for all the phonemes used in the current language (although some orthographies use devices such as diacritics to increase the number of available letters).
Sometimes, conversely, a single letter may represent a sequence of more than one phoneme (as x can represent the sequence /ks/ in English and other languages).
Sometimes, the rules of correspondence are more complex and depend on adjacent letters, often as a result of historical sound changes (as with the rules for the pronunciation of ca and ci in Italian and the silent e in English).

Case 2: Irregular
Pronunciation and spelling do not always correspond in a predictable way
 Sometimes, different letters correspond to the same phoneme (for instance u and ó in Polish are both pronounced as the phoneme /u/). That is often for historical reasons (the Polish letters originally stood for different phonemes, which later merged phonologically). That affects the predictability of spelling from pronunciation but not necessarily vice versa. Another example is found in Modern Greek, whose phoneme /i/ can be written in six different ways: ι, η, υ, ει, οι and υι.
 Conversely, a letter or group of letters can correspond to different phonemes in different contexts. For example, th in English can be pronounced as /ð/ (as in this) or /θ/ (as in thin), as well as /th/ (as in goatherd).
Spelling may otherwise represent a historical pronunciation; orthography does not necessarily keep up with sound changes in the spoken language. For example, both the k and the digraph gh of English knight were once pronounced (the latter is still pronounced in some Scots varieties), but after the loss of their sounds, they no longer represent the word's phonemic structure or its pronunciation.
Spelling may represent the pronunciation of a different dialect from the one being considered.
Spellings of loanwords often adhere to or are influenced by the orthography of the source language (as with the English words ballet and fajita, from French and Spanish respectively). With some loanwords, though, regularity is retained either by 
 nativizing the pronunciation to match the spelling (as with the Russian word шофёр, from French chauffeur but pronounced  in accordance with the normal rules of Russian vowel reduction; see also spelling pronunciation) or by 
 nativizing the spelling (for example, football is spelt fútbol in Spanish and futebol in Portuguese).
Spelling may reflect a folk etymology (as in the English words hiccough and island, so spelt because of an imagined connection with the words cough and isle), or distant etymology (as in the English word debt in which the silent b was added under the influence of Latin).
 Spelling may reflect morphophonemic structure rather than the purely phonemic (see next section) although it is often also a reflection of historical pronunciation.

Most orthographies do not reflect the changes in pronunciation known as sandhi in which pronunciation is affected by adjacent sounds in neighboring words (written Sanskrit and other Indian languages, however, reflect such changes). A language may also use different sets of symbols or different rules for distinct sets of vocabulary items such as the Japanese hiragana and katakana syllabaries (and the different treatment in English orthography of words derived from Latin and Greek).

Morphophonemic features 
Alphabetic orthographies often have features that are morphophonemic rather than purely phonemic. This means that the spelling reflects to some extent the underlying morphological structure of the words, not only their pronunciation. Hence different forms of a morpheme (minimum meaningful unit of language) are often spelt identically or similarly in spite of differences in their pronunciation. That is often for historical reasons; the morphophonemic spelling reflects a previous pronunciation from before historical sound changes that caused the variation in pronunciation of a given morpheme. Such spellings can assist in the recognition of words when reading.

Some examples of morphophonemic features in orthography are described below.
(However, when this morpheme takes the form , the addition of the vowel is reflected in the spelling: churches, masses.)
Many English words retain spellings that reflect their etymology and morphology rather than their present-day pronunciation. For example, sign and signature include the spelling , which means the same but is pronounced differently in the two words. Other examples are science  vs. conscience , prejudice  vs. prequel , nation  vs. nationalism , and special  vs. species .
Phonological assimilation is often not reflected in spelling even in otherwise phonemic orthographies such as Spanish, in which obtener "obtain" and optimista "optimist" are written with b and p, but are commonly neutralized with regard to voicing and pronounced in various ways, such as both [β] in neutral style or both [p] in emphatic pronunciation. On the other hand, Serbo-Croatian (Serbian, Croatian, Bosnian and Montenegrin) spelling reflects assimilation so one writes Србија/Srbija "Serbia" but српски/srpski "Serbian".
The final-obstruent devoicing that occurs in many languages (such as German, Polish and Russian) is not normally reflected in the spelling. For example, in German, Bad "bath" is spelt with a final  even though it is pronounced , thus corresponding to other morphologically related forms such as the verb baden (bathe) in which the d is pronounced . (Compare ,  ("advice", "advise") in which the t is pronounced  in both positions.)  Turkish orthography, however, is more strictly phonemic: for example, the imperative of eder "does" is spelled et, as it is pronounced (and the same as the word for "meat"), not *ed, as it would be if German spelling were used.

Korean hangul has changed over the centuries from a highly phonemic to a largely morphophonemic orthography. Japanese kana are almost completely phonemic but have a few morphophonemic aspects, notably in the use of ぢ di and づ du (rather than じ ji and ず zu, their pronunciation in standard Tokyo dialect), when the character is a voicing of an underlying ち or つ. That is from the rendaku sound change combined with the yotsugana merger of formally different morae. The Russian orthography is also mostly morphophonemic, because it does not reflect vowel reduction, consonant assimilation and final-obstruent devoicing. Also, some consonant combinations have silent consonants.

Defective orthographies
A defective orthography is one that is not capable of representing all the phonemes or phonemic distinctions in a language.

Comparison between languages 
Languages whose current orthographies have a high grapheme-to-phoneme and phoneme-to-grapheme correspondence (excluding exceptions due to loan words and assimilation) include:
Afrikaans
Amharic
Kurdish
Maltese
Estonian (apart from palatalization or long and "over-long" phoneme length distinction)
Finnish
Albanian
Georgian
Hindi (apart from schwa deletion)
Sanskrit
Kannada
Telugu
Malayalam
Dhivehi 
Turkish (apart from ğ and various palatal and vowel allophones)
Serbo-Croatian (Serbian, Croatian, Bosnian and Montenegrin; written in either Cyrillic or Latin script)
Slovenian
Bulgarian
Macedonian (if the apostrophe denoting schwa is counted, though slight inconsistencies may be found)
Eastern Armenian (apart from o, v)
Basque (apart from palatalized l, n)
Haitian Creole
Spanish (apart from h, x, b/v, and sometimes k, c, g, j, z)
Czech (apart from ě, ů, y, ý)
Polish (apart from ó, ch, rz and nasal vowels ą and ę)
Romanian (apart from â or î (see Î versus Â))
Ukrainian (mainly phonemic with some other historical/morphological rules, as well as palatalization)
Belarusian (phonemic for vowels but mostly morphophonemic for consonants except ў written phonetically)
Swahili (missing aspirated consonants, which do not occur in all varieties and anyway are sparsely used)
Azerbaijani (apart from k)
Hungarian (apart from j and ly)
Oromo

Many otherwise phonemic orthographies are slightly defective: Malay (incl. Malaysian and Indonesian), Italian, Maltese, Welsh, and Kazakh do not fully distinguish their vowels; Lithuanian, Latvian, and Serbo-Croatian do not distinguish tone and vowel length (also additional vowels for Lithuanian and Latvian); Somali does not distinguish vowel phonation; and the graphemes b and v represent the same phoneme in all varieties of Spanish (except in Valencia), while in the Spanish of the Americas,  can be represented by graphemes s, c, or z. Modern Indo-Aryan languages like Hindi, Punjabi, Gujarati, Maithili and several others feature schwa deletion, where the implicit default vowel is suppressed without being explicitly marked as such. Others, like Marathi, do not have a high grapheme-to-phoneme correspondence for vowel lengths.

French, with its silent letters and its heavy use of nasal vowels and elision, may seem to lack much correspondence between spelling and pronunciation, but its rules on pronunciation, though complex, are consistent and predictable with a fair degree of accuracy. The phoneme-to-letter correspondence, on the other hand, is often low and a sequence of sounds may have multiple ways of being spelt, often with different meanings.

Orthographies such as those of German, Hungarian (mainly phonemic with the exception ly, j representing the same sound, but consonant and vowel length are not always accurate and various spellings reflect etymology, not pronunciation), Portuguese, and modern Greek (written with the Greek alphabet), as well as Korean hangul, are sometimes considered to be of intermediate depth (for example they include many morphophonemic features, as described above).

Similarly to French, it is much easier to infer the pronunciation of a German word from its spelling than vice versa. For example, for speakers who merge /eː/ and /ɛː/, the phoneme /eː/ may be spelt e, ee, eh, ä or äh.

English orthography is highly non-phonemic. The irregularity of English spelling arises partly because the Great Vowel Shift occurred after the orthography was established; partly because English has acquired a large number of loanwords at different times, retaining their original spelling at varying levels; and partly because the regularisation of the spelling (moving away from the situation in which many different spellings were acceptable for the same word) happened arbitrarily over a period without any central plan. However even English has general, albeit complex, rules that predict pronunciation from spelling, and several of these rules are successful most of the time; rules to predict spelling from the pronunciation have a higher failure rate.

Most constructed languages such as Esperanto and Lojban have mostly phonemic orthographies.

The syllabary systems of Japanese (hiragana and katakana) are examples of almost perfectly shallow orthography – exceptions include the use of ぢ and づ (discussed above) and the use of は, を, and へ to represent the sounds わ, お, and え, as relics of historical kana usage. There is also no indication of pitch accent, which results in homography of words like 箸 and 橋 (はし in hiragana), which are distinguished in speech.

Xavier Marjou uses an artificial neural network to rank 17 orthographies according to their level of Orthographic depth. Among the tested orthographies, Chinese and French orthographies, followed by English and Russian, are the most opaque regarding writing (i.e. phonemes to graphemes direction) and English, followed by Dutch, is the most opaque regarding reading (i.e. graphemes to phonemes direction); Esperanto, Arabic, Finnish, Korean, Serbo-Croatian and Turkish are very shallow both to read and to write; Italian is shallow to read and very shallow to write, Breton, German, Portuguese and Spanish are shallow to read and to write.

Realignment of orthography
With time, pronunciations change and spellings become out of date, as has happened to English and French. In order to maintain a phonemic orthography such a system would need periodic updating, as has been attempted by various language regulators and proposed by other spelling reformers.

Sometimes the pronunciation of a word changes to match its spelling; this is called a spelling pronunciation. This is most common with loanwords, but occasionally occurs in the case of established native words too.

In some English personal names and place names, the relationship between the spelling of the name and its pronunciation is so distant that associations between phonemes and graphemes cannot be readily identified. Moreover, in many other words, the pronunciation has subsequently evolved from a fixed spelling, so that it has to be said that the phonemes represent the graphemes rather than vice versa. And in much technical jargon, the primary medium of communication is the written language rather than the spoken language, so the phonemes represent the graphemes, and it is unimportant how the word is pronounced. Moreover, the sounds which literate people perceive being heard in a word are significantly influenced by the actual spelling of the word.

Sometimes, countries have the written language undergo a spelling reform to realign the writing with the contemporary spoken language. These can range from simple spelling changes and word forms to switching the entire writing system itself, as when Turkey switched from the Arabic alphabet to a Turkish alphabet of Latin origin.

Phonetic transcription 

Methods for phonetic transcription such as the International Phonetic Alphabet (IPA) aim to describe pronunciation in a standard form. They are often used to solve ambiguities in the spelling of written language. They may also be used to write languages with no previous written form.  Systems like IPA can be used for phonemic representation or for showing more detailed phonetic information (see Narrow vs. broad transcription).

Phonemic orthographies are different from phonetic transcription; whereas in a phonemic orthography, allophones will usually be represented by the same grapheme, a purely phonetic script would demand that phonetically distinct allophones be distinguished. To take an example from American English: the  sound in the words "table" and "cat" would, in a phonemic orthography, be written with the same character; however, a strictly phonetic script would make a distinction between the aspirated "t" in "table", the flap in "butter", the unaspirated "t" in "stop" and the glottalized "t" in "cat" (not all these allophones exist in all English dialects). A perfect phonemic orthography has one letter per group of sounds (phoneme), with different letters only where the sounds distinguish words (so "bed" is spelled differently from "bet").

A narrow phonetic transcription represents phones, the sounds humans are capable of producing, many of which will often be grouped together as a single phoneme in any given natural language, though the groupings vary across languages.  English, for example, does not distinguish between aspirated and unaspirated consonants, but other languages, like Korean, Bengali and Hindi do.

The sounds of speech of all languages of the world can be written by a rather small universal phonetic alphabet. A standard for this is the International Phonetic Alphabet.

See also
Alphabetic principle
English-language spelling reform
Spelling
Morphophonology
Orthographic depth
Orthographic transcription

References

Orthography
Phonetics
Phonology
Spelling